Liviero is an Italian surname. Notable people with the surname include:

Dino Liviero (1938–1970), Italian cyclist
Matteo Liviero (born 1993), Italian footballer

References

Italian-language surnames